Gerald Ross is a musician.

Gerald Ross may also refer to:

Jerry Ross (painter) (Gerald)
Jerold Ross, composer

See also
Jerry Ross (disambiguation)
Gerard Ross (disambiguation)